This is a list of notable people who have died from anorexia nervosa, in chronological order.

1380: Catherine of Siena – Italian Saint, aged 33
1387: Pierre de Luxembourg – French Catholic bishop, aged 17
1882: Sophie Gray – Scottish model, aged 38
1909: Renée Vivien – British poet who wrote in the French language, aged 32
1936: Irene Fenwick – American stage and silent film actress, aged 49
1957: Caren "Sande" Crabbe – Daughter of Buster Crabbe, aged 20
1982: Helga Braathen – Norwegian gymnast, aged 29
1983: Karen Carpenter – American singer, drummer (The Carpenters), aged 32
1994: Christy Henrich – American gymnast, aged 22
1996: Cynthia MacGregor – American tennis player, aged 31
1997: Heidi Guenther – American ballerina, aged 22
1997: Michael Krasnow – American author, My Life as a Male Anorexic, aged 28
2003: Helen Moros – New Zealand long-distance runner, aged 35
2003: Debbie Barham – English comedy writer, aged 26
2006: Luisel Ramos – Uruguayan model, aged 22
2006: Ana Carolina Reston – Brazilian model, aged 21
2007: Eliana Ramos – Uruguayan model, younger sister of Luisel Ramos, aged 18
2007: Hila Elmalich – Israeli model, aged 33
2010: Isabelle Caro – French model, anorexia activist, and actress, aged 28
2018: Javiera Muñoz – Swedish singer, aged 40
2021: Nikki Grahame – English television personality, aged 38

See also
 History of anorexia nervosa
 List of people who died of starvation
 Lists of people by cause of death

References

 
Anorexia